Andrea Bogorová (born 27 February 2000) is a Slovak footballer who plays as a forward for I. liga žien club Spartak Myjava and the Slovakia women's national team.

References

2000 births
Living people
Women's association football forwards
Slovak women's footballers
Slovakia women's international footballers
Spartak Myjava players